Vladimir Nikolaevich Kravtsov (October 19, 1949 – December 2, 1999) was a Soviet/Russian handball player who competed in the 1976 Summer Olympics and in the 1980 Summer Olympics. In 1976 he won the gold medal with the Soviet team. He played all six matches and scored fourteen goals. Four years later he was part of the Soviet team which won the silver medal. He played four matches and scored eleven goals.

References

External links

Profile databaseolympics.com
Vladimir Kravtsov's profile at Sport-Strana.ru 

1949 births
1999 deaths
Soviet male handball players
Russian male handball players
Handball players at the 1976 Summer Olympics
Handball players at the 1980 Summer Olympics
Olympic handball players of the Soviet Union
Olympic gold medalists for the Soviet Union
Olympic silver medalists for the Soviet Union
Olympic medalists in handball
Medalists at the 1980 Summer Olympics
Medalists at the 1976 Summer Olympics